Transparent is a 2005 documentary film written, directed, and produced by Jules Rosskam. Its title is a play on the words “trans” and “parent” implying the invisibility of transgender parenting in society today. The documentary follows 19 transgender men from 14 different states who have given birth to, and in most cases, gone on to raise, their biological children and the challenges they face while transitioning.

The film is most well known for its viewing at the Paris's International Feminist Festival, and was featured in the September 2006 issue of Curve magazine as one of the Ten Must-See Gender Documentaries, represented as one of the best examples of New Trans Cinema alongside well-known films such as Transamerica, Boys Don't Cry and Soldier's Girl.

Synopsis
Transparent follows the lives of 19 transgender men as they recall their encounters giving birth to and raising children while transitioning. For most, they did not view it as a weird concept to explain to their kids, especially at a young age, because none of the politics had to go into their explanation, they could simply state the facts and the children were accepting of that. For example, the common explanation to their children was that they were “born with a girl body but a boy heart.” In addition, they still felt as though they were their child's mother because biologically, they were, they just were no longer a mother figure. However, most of them were still being referred to by their child as “mom”.

Although most of them were in agreement about the issues discussed, the topic of how they felt during pregnancy was a little different. Some felt that it was the only time they felt right with their bodies and they enjoyed the experience overall, while others felt humiliated and like it was a slap in the face – concrete evidence this wasn't who they really were.

Cast
Matt (Los Angeles, CA)
Ricky (Oakland, CA)
Andrew (Butlerville, IN)
Kosse (Westfield, MA)
Nick (Denver, CO)
Matthew (Topeka, KS)
Dan (Lincoln, NE)
Terry (Lawton, OK)
Kim (Longmont, CO)
Raven (Hubbardston, MA)
Alex (DC Area)
Rene (Ft. Collins, CO)
Brandon (Oakland, CA)
Jay (Dayton, OH)
Logan (Birmingham, AL)
Joey (Dallas, TX)
Jarek (St. Louis, MO)
Justin (Brooklyn, NY)
Thomas (Weed, CA)

Production
MamSir Productions and directed, produced, and edited by Jules Rosskam with the help of Anat Salomon, Transparent was also contributed to with footage by Dyke TV, the Gavin-Smyth Family, and Evan Schwartz.
Additional Thanks to: Lani Lacovelli, Elizabeth Cline, Elizabeth McCarthy, Anezka Sebek, Sam Feder, Lori Barrett, Chris Baronofski, Marilyn and Skip Rosskam, Tristan Taormino, Bennington College, In the Life Media, the New York City Trans Community, and the Leslie Lohman Gay Art Foundation.
Special thanks to: Alex Fox, Andrew Kelley, Brandon Wolfe, Dan Franks, Jay Moore, Jarek Steele, Joey Vasques, Justin Cascio, Kim R Lee, Kosse Feral, Logan England, Matt Rice, Matthew York, Nick Sarchet, Raven Kaldera, Rene Hickman, Ricky Levya, Terry Siegrist, Thomas More II, Anat Salomon, Desi del Valle.
Donors: Merle and Steve Rosskam, Marilyn and Skip Rosskam, The Indiana Transgender Rights Advocacy Alliance, Emily Walker, Pam and Michale Burger, Nancy Shrier, Lani Lacovelli, Tim Carey, Kim R Lee, John and Bonney Teare.

Screenings
2009:
 Manchester Pride Film Festival
2008: 
 Kansai Queer Film Festival (Japan)
 WTTW Public Broadcasting (Chicago)
2007:
 Out and Equal Workplace Summit 
 Vancouver Queer Film and Video Festival 
 The Netherlands Transgender Film Festival 
 Fairytales Film Festival 
 Athens LGBT film Festival 
 Connecticut Gay and Lesbian Film Festival 
 Freiburger Lesbenfilmtage 
 National Women's Studies Association Conference 
 Munich Women's Filmfest Bimovie 
 WPIRG Rainbow Reel Film Festival 
 Lesbisch Schwule Filmtage Hamburg 
 Image + Nation 
 Paris Lesbian Film Festival 
2006:
 Hamburg International Lesbian and Gay Film Festival
 1st annual Warsaw LGBT Film Festival 
 North Carolina LGBT Film Festival 
 Pink Days Amsterdam 
 Paris Feminist Film Festival 
 Northwestern University 
 Lesgaicinemadrid Film Festival 2006
 Guelph International Film Festival 
 Lisbon Gay and Lesbian Film Festival 
 Glasgay! Film Festival 
 Tel Aviv LGBT Film Festival 
 Florence Queer Film Festival 
 Inside/Out Festival Toronto
 London Lesbian and Gay Film Festival 
 Hallwalls Contemporary Art Center 
2005:
 Indiana Transgender Rights Advocacy Alliance 
 Mardis Gras Film Festival 
 The Pioneer Theater 
 Reeling: Chicago LGBT Film Festival 
 Outfest 
 Philadelphia International Gay and Lesbian Film Festival 
 NewFest
 San Francisco International Gay and Lesbian Film Festival

Awards and nominations
1st annual Warsaw LGBT Film Festival: Best New Film
Inside/Out Festival Toronto: Best Documentary

References

Kane, Matt. "Transgender Characters That Changed Film and Television." GLAAD. N.p., 19 Nov. 2012. Web. 5 June 2015.<http://www.glaad.org/blog/transgender-characters-changed-film-and-television-transwk>
Willis, Raquel. "Hollywood, You're Halfway There With Trans Representation." The Huffington Post. TheHuffingtonPost.com, n.d. Web. 5 June 2015.<http://www.huffingtonpost.com/raquel-willis/hollywood-youre-halfway-t_b_6463288.html>
Siede, Caroline. "Writing For Justice: Diversity in Our Entertainment Matters - Gay Lesbian Bi Trans News Archive - Windy City Times." Writing For Justice: Diversity in Our Entertainment Matters. N.p., 27 May 2015. Web. 5 June 2015.<http://www.windycitymediagroup.com/lgbt/Writing-For-Justice-Diversity-in-our-entertainment-matters/51604.html>
Rosskam, Jules. "Transparent." Jules Rosskam. N.p., n.d. Web. 5 June 2015. <http://www.julesrosskam.com/transparent/>

Transgender-related documentary films
Films about trans men
American documentary films
2006 films
2006 LGBT-related films
LGBT parenting in the United States
American LGBT-related films
2000s English-language films
2000s American films